Carola Hicks (7 November 1941 – 23 June 2010) was a British art historian.

She was born Carola Brown in Bognor Regis, West Sussex, and educated at the Lady Eleanor Holles School and the University of Edinburgh, where she took a first in archaeology in 1964. Carola returned to Edinburgh and gained her PhD, in 1967, on "Origins of the animal style in English Romanesque art". Hicks worked at the British Museum researching the Sutton Hoo ship burial, before becoming a research fellow at Lucy Cavendish College, Cambridge, and then curator of the Stained Glass Museum at Ely Cathedral. She became a fellow at Newnham College, Cambridge, where she taught until her early death.

Angela Thirlwell describes Hicks as a "glamorous academic and a serious populariser of art", who "swept the dust off old masterpieces, explained their cultural contexts and infused them with life for a new public".

Hicks wrote and edited several books:
England in the Eleventh Century (editor, 1992), from the "Harlaxton Medieval Studies" series (vol. II) 
Animals in Early Medieval Art (1993)
Cambridgeshire Churches (editor, 1997)
Discovering Stained Glass (2005), by John Harries and revised by Carola Hicks, from the Shire series 
Improper Pursuits: The Scandalous Life of Lady Di Beauclerk (2001), about Lady Diana Beauclerk
The Bayeux Tapestry: The Life Story of a Masterpiece (2006), in which she suggested Edith of Wessex as the author of the Bayeux Tapestry
The King's Glass: A Story of Tudor Power and Secret Art (2007), about the stained-glass windows of King's College Chapel
Girl in a Green Gown: The History and Mystery of the Arnolfini Portrait (2011), about Jan van Eyck's Arnolfini Portrait

References

1941 births
2010 deaths
British art historians
Women art historians
Alumni of the University of Edinburgh
Fellows of Newnham College, Cambridge
British curators
People educated at Lady Eleanor Holles School
People from Bognor Regis
British women historians
British women curators